Thunder Canyon is a river rapids ride located at two Cedar Fair amusement parks. It has been installed at three parks, Cedar Point in Sandusky, Ohio, Dorney Park & Wildwater Kingdom in Allentown, Pennsylvania and Valleyfair in Shakopee, Minnesota. All of the rides include water falls and water shoots.

Information

Cedar Point

Thunder Canyon is one of two water rides at Cedar Point, the other being Snake River Falls. Thunder Canyon uses water pumped in from Sandusky Bay every morning instead of a closed water system on many other water rides. The ride closes every year in late August to be transformed into Cornstalkers 2.0: Revenge of the Pumpkin Heads, an attraction for HalloWeekends.

Dorney Park & Wildwater Kingdom

Thunder Canyon is located towards the back of the park. It can be found along the back path leading to Wildwater Kingdom while the ride itself is placed on four acres of land within the track of the Cedar Creek Cannonball. The attraction is 1,640 feet long, uses 200 horsepower pumps to generate the river using one million gallons of water at a rate of 112,000 gallons per minute, and was designed by Barr Engineering for the cost of $3.8 Million. This ride is unique compared to other rides of the same type for a few reasons. The ride is known for being one of the wettest version of its type. It is also known for its special use of its water reservoir, which instead of being hidden back stage, is used as a dramatic million gallon backdrop for the ride. Thunder Canyon is one of three water rides at Dorney Park, the other two being White Water Landing and Thunder Creek Mountain.

Valleyfair

Thunder Canyon is one of two water rides at Valleyfair, the other one being The Wave.

See also
 White Water Canyon - River Raft ride located at other Cedar Fair parks.
 Thunder Canyon at Silverwood Theme Park is a river rapids ride with the same name.

References

External links
 Official page at Cedar Point
 Official page at Dorney Park
 Official page at Valleyfair

Amusement rides introduced in 1986
Amusement rides introduced in 1987
Amusement rides introduced in 1995
Cedar Fair attractions
Dorney Park & Wildwater Kingdom
Water rides manufactured by Barr Engineering
Water rides manufactured by Intamin